Factor X is the Spanish version of the British television music competition The X Factor, created by Simon Cowell. The show, first aired on Cuatro between 2007 and 2008, following the British format from 2005 to 2006, with three categories, mentored by one judge each, whom choose the acts to represent the category in the live shows. The judges were singer and DJ Miqui Puig, music manager and headhunter Eva Perales and music radio producer Jorge Flo. Nuria Roca hosted the show. The first season was won by María Villalón. The second season was won by Vocal Tempo.

On 27 September 2017, Telecinco announced the revival of the series with the production of a new season. It was hosted by Jesús Vázquez. On 19 December 2017, it was announced that the panel of mentors would consist of singer Laura Pausini, publicist and television personality Risto Mejide, radio host Xavi Martínez, and musician and music producer Fernando Montesinos. Nando Escribano hosted the side show Xtra Factor, which aired on Divinity. In 2019 it was initially announced that Telecinco renewed the series for a fourth season, but Fremantle España CEO Nathalie García stated later in the year that there were no plans for a new season.

Season summary
 "16-24s" category
 "Boys" category
 "Girls" category
 "Over 25s" category
 "Groups" category

Judges' categories and their contestants
In each season, each judge is allocated a category to mentor and chooses acts to progress to the live shows. This table shows, for each season, which category each judge was allocated and which acts he or she put through to the live shows.

Key:
 – Winning judge/category. Winners are in bold, eliminated contestants in small font.

Season 1 (2007)
The first season started its run on Sunday 13 May 2007. The show was then broadcast nightly with 'Los Castings' (the auditions), which lasted until 20 May 2007. From the 21 May until 27 May 2007 'La Selección Final' (final selection) was shown, again nightly. On 28 May 'Las Galas' (live shows) began. Factor X proved successful for TV channel Cuatro. It achieved an average rating of 12.3%. Factor X live shows were shown at 10pm every Monday evening.

Contestants
Key:
 – Winner
 – Runner-up
 – Third place

Results summary
  – Contestant announced as safe (no particular order)
  – Contestant was in the bottom two/three and had to sing again in the final showdown
  – Contestant was in the bottom three but received the fewest votes and was immediately eliminated
  – Contestant received the fewest public votes and was immediately eliminated (no final showdown)

Season 2 (2008)
The second season started its run 1 September 2008 with the auditions. The first "gala" or live show was aired on 22 September, on primetime. In a similar fashion to the last seasons in the original British version, each gala had a different theme (number-one hits or 80's music, for example). Five acts were chosen for the finals in each category, and an additional contestant was chosen in the middle of the season through Internet auditions

Contestants
Key:
 – Winner
 – Runner-up
 – Third place

Results summary
  – Contestant did not against public vote
  – Contestant announced as safe (no particular order)
  – Contestant was in the bottom two/three and had to sing again in the final showdown
  – Contestant was in the bottom three but received the fewest votes and was immediately eliminated
  – Contestant received the fewest public votes and was immediately eliminated (no final showdown)

Season 3 (2018)
The third season premiered on Telecinco on 13 April 2018, ten years after its run on Cuatro.

Contestants
Key:
 – Winner
 – Runner-up
 – Third place

Results summary
  – Contestant announced as safe (no particular order unless noted otherwise)
  – Contestant was in the bottom two/three/four and had to sing again in the final showdown
  – Contestant was in the bottom three/four but received the fewest votes and was eliminated
  – Contestant was in the bottom four but received the most votes and was saved
  – Contestant received the fewest public votes and was immediately eliminated (no final showdown)

Live show details

Week 1 (8 June 2018)

Judges vote to eliminate
Montesinos: El Niño Bermejo
Pausini: Gema Tomás
Mejide: El Niño Bermejo
Martínez: Gema Tomás

Week 2 (15 June 2018)

Judges vote to eliminate
Mejide: Oscárboles
Pausini: Oscárboles
Martínez: Oscárboles
Montesinos: Oscárboles (initially tried to refuse to vote because both acts in the sing-off were from his category and, since everyone else had already voted to eliminate Oscárboles, his vote wouldn't really make a difference; only cast a vote when host Jesús Vázquez insisted that he had to because of the show's rules)

Week 3 (22 June 2018)

Judges vote to eliminate
Montesinos: Poupie
Martínez: Fusa Nocta
Pausini: Fusa Nocta
Mejide: Poupie (both acts in the sing-off were from his category; he requested to be the last to vote so that he could force a deadlock and leave the decision in the audience's hands)

Week 4 (29 June 2018)

Judges vote to eliminate
Mejide: Poupie (voted in favor of W-Caps, an act from Martínez's category, voting against Poupie from his category)
Pausini: W-Caps
Martínez: Poupie
Montesinos: Poupie

Week 5 (5 July 2018)

Ratings

Season 4 (canceled)
Telecinco initially announced a fourth season for 2019. Alejandro Sanz and Isabel Pantoja were offered a slot in the jury, but both reportedly declined. In November 2019, the CEO of Fremantle Spain, Nathalie García, stated that there were no plans for a new season.

Post Factor X
A few weeks after the first season ended, eventual winner María Villalon released a debut EP entitled María Villalon, an album with all the songs she sang whilst in the competition. A few months later, she released her debut album Te Espero Aquí, which made the Spanish top 40 album chart, just like her debut LP did. But she wasn't the only one who received a record deal, runner-up Angy released her debut self-titled album (with the artistic name Angy) a couple of weeks after Villalon's debut album release. She also began an acting career starring in the teen drama television series Física y Química, aired on Antena 3. 3rd placed Walter released a single, but it didn't see much success. Angy's debut single 'Sola En Silencio' was a major hit across Spain, making the top 20 in Spanish Los 40 Principales. In turn, Maria Villalon's first two singles 'Aguita De Abril' and 'Te Espero Aqui' failed to gain chart stardom, but her second album saw the success of its lead single 'La lluvia' which made it into the top 5 in Los 40 Principales.

Months after the contest finished, 6th placed Leire Martínez's popularity boosted as she was chosen to replace Amaia Montero as the new lead singer of La Oreja de Van Gogh, one of the best-selling pop bands in Spain and Latin America. Her first album with the band, A las cinco en el Astoria, was released on 2 September 2008 reaching the number-one spot in the Spanish charts.

8th placed Ailyn submitted a song to Salvemos Eurovisión, the Spanish selection for the 2008 Eurovision Song Contest, but failed to get to the final round. Later that year, she was chosen to be the new female vocalist of the Norwegian Gothic Metal band Sirenia, working with them until 2016.

After the third season ended, judge Laura Pausini invited some of the contestants, including her pupils Samuel Hernández and series winner Pol Granch, to serve as opening acts for her upcoming world tour.

References and notes

Notes

External links
Official site 

Spain
Spanish reality television series
Spanish music television series
Television series by Fremantle (company)
2000s Spanish television series
2007 Spanish television series debuts
2008 Spanish television series endings
Spanish television series based on British television series